The Pistol Shrimps is a 2016 Canadian-American documentary film about the all-female recreational basketball team of the same name, written and directed by Brent Hodge. The film stars Aubrey Plaza, Molly Hawkey, Angela Trimbur, Melissa Stetten, Maria Blasucci, and Jesse Thomas. The film had its world premiere at the Tribeca Film Festival on April 14, 2016. The film was released on June 16, 2016 by Seeso.

Synopsis
The film follows the Los Angeles-based all-female recreational basketball team the Pistol Shrimps (which includes members Aubrey Plaza, Molly Hawkey, and Angela Trimbur) during their 2015 season.

Cast
 Aubrey Plaza
 Molly Hawkey
 Angela Trimbur
 Melissa Stetten
 Maria Blasucci
 Jesse Thomas
 Amanda Lund
 Steven Brydle

Release
The Pistol Shrimps had its world premiere at the Tribeca Film Festival on April 14, 2016. The worldwide film rights were acquired by the comedy subscription streaming service Seeso on the day of the film's premiere. It also screened at the Seattle International Film Festival on June 1, 2016. The film was  released on June 16, 2016.

References

External links
 

2016 films
2016 documentary films
American sports documentary films
Canadian sports documentary films
Films shot in Los Angeles
Women's sports in California
Women's basketball in the United States
Documentary films about basketball
Films directed by Brent Hodge
2010s English-language films
American basketball films
Canadian basketball films
2010s Canadian films
2010s American films